Cigogne was the second of two Aigrette-class submarines built for the French Navy between 1903 and 1905. Laid down in May 1902, she was launched in November 1904 and commissioned in July 1906. She was an essentially experimental submarine, and although in service during World War I, saw no action. The class was designed by Maxime Laubeuf and used Drzewiecki drop collar launchers and external cradles to launch torpedoes.

Design
Her complement was 14 men.

Construction and career

Cigogne was laid down on 13 May 1902, launched on 11 November 1904 and commissioned on 18 July 1906.

Cigogne was retired from service on 12 November 1919 and sold for scrap at Toulon on 14 April 1920.

See also 

List of submarines of France

References

Citations 

World War I submarines of France
Aigrette-class submarines
1904 ships